The render safe procedure (RSP) is the portion of the explosive ordnance disposal procedures involving the application of special explosive ordnance disposal procedures, methods and tools to provide the interruption of functions or separation of essential components of unexploded ordnance (including improvised explosive devices) to prevent an unintended detonation.

Overview
Ordnance detonations may be broadly categorized as a high order detonation or a low order detonation. A high order detonation is generally an ordnance detonation that results in an explosive ordnance producing a designed/intended explosive yield. A low order detonation is generally a controlled ordnance detonation or a malfunctioned ordnance detonation that results in a significantly lower yield than designed.

Render safe procedures and techniques apply to conventional ordnance such as nuclear, chemical, biological and conventional battlefield weapons/ordnance and unconventional ordnance such as improvised explosive devices (IED) and improvised nuclear devices (IND). RSPs can also apply to explosive components of military equipment such as may be found in military vehicles and aircraft – ejection seats, explosive bolts, etc.

In civilian circles, RSPs can apply to items that can be dangerous if not handled properly, i.e. air bags and seat belt pretensioners. These are often detonated in a safe environment after replacement to comply with local legislation surrounding transport of dangerous goods.

References 

Bomb disposal
Land warfare
Emergency services